Adébọ̀wálé is both a surname and a given name of Yoruba origin, meaning "the crown or royalty returns back home". Notable people with the name include:

Given name 
 Adebowale A. Adeyemo, Nigerian physician-scientist and genetic epidemiologist 
 Adebowale Adefuye (1947–2015), Nigerian diplomat and historian
 Adebowale Ogungbure (born 1981), Nigerian footballer

Surname 

 Bayo Adebowale (born 1944), Nigerian poet, writer, critic and librarian
Emmanuel Adebowale (born 1997), English footballer
 Michael Adebowale (born 1991), Islamist convicted of the murder of Lee Rigby
 Victor Adebowale, Baron Adebowale (born 1962), British politician

References 

Yoruba-language surnames